Corranabinnia is a 714 m (2,343 ft) mountain located in County Mayo, Ireland.

You can climb to the top of this mountain through a very steep ridge known locally as McGregor&Lucas ridge.

See also 

Lists of mountains in Ireland
List of mountains of the British Isles by height (1501–2000)
List of Marilyns in the British Isles
List of Hewitt mountains in England, Wales and Ireland

References

Hewitts of Ireland
Marilyns of Ireland
Mountains and hills of County Mayo
Mountains under 1000 metres